Steve Perkins may refer to:

 Stephen Perkins (born 1967), American musician and songwriter
 Steve Perkins (footballer) (born 1954), English footballer
 Stephen W. Perkins (1809–?), American politician in Texas